Şehr-i Hüzün (English: City of Sorrows)  is the second album by Turkish rock band Manga. It was released by Sony BMG in April 2009.

Track listing

Album information
The album initially placed at #36 in the Turkish Charts, even though it was released just two days ahead of 2010. As of March 2010 Şehr-i Hüzün made it in to the Top 10 in MTV Turkey and has enjoyed rising success in MTV European Charts. Allmusic rated in 3,5 stars out of 5, saying that "this take on two pretty stale genres [nu metal and folk] is surprisingly fresh, if kitschy in its bombastic sensibility".

References 

2009 albums
Manga (band) albums